is a two disc image album for Reiko Okano's manga adaptation of Baku Yumemakura's novel series of the same name. The first disc features performances by gagaku ensemble , the second features performances by Brian Eno and J. Peter Schwalm.

Track listing

CD1
Sojo no Choshi Bongen - 4:52
Shundeika [Togaku Bugaku] - 7:55
Oshikicho no Choshi - 2:39
Jussuiraku [Togaku Kangen] - 4:45
Yoshinso [Biwa Hikyoku] - 3:03
Ichikotsucho no Sugagai - 1:38
Ryo-o Ranjo [Togaku Bugaku] - 9:03
Hyojo no Choshi - 2:51
Bairo no Ha [Togaku Bugaku] - 5:42
Asukai [Saibara] - 4:31
Banshikicho no Choshi - 4:58
Soko [Togaku Bugaku] - 14:28
Taishikicho no Choshi - 2:34
Chogeishi [Togaku Bugaku] - 2:58
Jisei [Roei] - 6:52

CD2
Star Gods - 7:43
Six Small Pictures - 6:08
Connecting Heaven to Earth - 3:55
Little Lights - 4:33
The Milky Way - 2:33
Faraway Suns - 3:21

Credits

CD1
Sukeyasu Shiba: Music Director (1-15), Ryuteki (1-4, 7-9, 12-14), Chorus (5), Saezuri (7), Ei (12)
Ko Ishikawa: Shō (1-4, 8, 9, 11-14), Vocal (10), Chorus (5)
Tamami Tono: Shō (1-5, 8, 9, 12-14)
Kazue Tajima: Shō (1-4, 8, 9, 12-14)
Remi Miura: Shō (1, 2, 8, 9), Shoko (4)
Satoru Yaotani: Hichiriki (1-4, 8, 9, 12-14), Chorus (5)
Katsuhiko Tabuchi: Hichiriki (1, 2, 8, 9, 12-14), Biwa (4), Dadaiko (7)
Katsuyuki Kobayashi: Hichiriki (1-4, 8, 9, 12-14), Chorus (5)
Aya Motohashi: Hichiriki (1-5, 8, 9, 12-14)
Chiaki Yagi: Ryuteki (2, 7, 9, 12, 14), Biwa (4), Kakko (3, 4), Lead Vocal (5)
Takeshi Sasamoto: Ryuteki (2, 5, 7, 9, 12, 14), Taiko (4)
Kanako Nakamura: Ryuteki (2, 4, 7, 9, 12, 14)
Kahoru Nakamura: Biwa (3-5)
Naoko Miyamaru: Dadaiko (2, 9, 12, 14), Ryuteki (4), Kakko (3, 4), Shaku Byoshi (5)
Yuko Hirai: Kakko (1, 2, 7-9, 12), So (4), Ryuteki (7), San-no-Tsuzumi (8, 9, 13, 14)
Mika Noda: Daishoko (2, 7, 9, 12, 14), So (3-5)
Reiko Okano: Wagon (6, 10)
Ayumi Shimonoto: Vocal (15)
Ichiko Hashimoto: Piano (15)
Keishi Urata: Sound Architect (1-15)
Seiichi Takubo: Synthesizer Operator (1-15)

CD2
Music written, produced and performed by Brian Eno with J. Peter Schwalm.
Voice: Kyoko Inatome
Translation: Charmian Norman-Taylor
Published by Opal Music
J. Peter Schwalm published by Edition Outshine/BMG UFA

Music for Onmyo-Ji Staff
Produced by: Reiko Okano
Director: Yoshimoto Ishikawa (Victor Entertainment, Inc./JVC)
Recording Engineer: Keiichiro Yoshioka (Victor Aoyama Studio, Disc 1)
Assistant Engineers: Makoto Hoshino, Akitomo Takakuwa
Mastering Engineer: Kazushige Yamazaki
Art Director: Shin Sobue
Original Illustration: Reiko Okano
CG for Hologram: Takeshi Sawai, Tomohide Shigemura, Taro Kimura (Bus Plus One)
Editor: Yukio Yui (Victor Entertainment, Inc.)
Printing: Kinyosya Printing Co. Ltd.
Promotion Manager: Ikuo Kawasaki (Victor Entertainment, Inc.)
Promotion Staff: You Saito, Shiho Miyai (Victor Entertainment, Inc.)
Sales Promotion Manager: Akifumi Nkamura (Victor Entertainment, Inc.)
Sales Promotion Staff: Tetsuya Yamada, Hiroshi Yamashita (Victor Entertainment, Inc.)
Manager: Shiro Sasaki (Victor Entertainment, Inc.)
Senior Manager: Norio Uchiyama (Victor Entertainment, Inc.)
Special thanks to: Baku Yumemakura, Anthea Norman-Taylor, Charmian Norman-Taylor, Catherine Dempsey, Ray Hearn, Keiko Ishihara (Beatink), Alastair Prentice, Miki Nagata Prentice, Macoto Tezka, Hiroyuki Nakajo (Yumemakura Baku Office Ltd.), Haruto Uchiyama, Yasufumi Takagi (Hakusensha), Osamu Kato (Asahi Shimbun), Chiaki Ohtsu (Coz-Fish), Mayumi Komatsu, Norn Noemi, Shugo Kasuga, Takashi Otsuyama, Keiya Takahashi, Yasuko Makino
Onmyo-Ji Author: Reiko Okano
Original Story: Baku Yumemakura

References

Brian Eno soundtracks
2000 soundtrack albums
Book soundtracks